USNS Mohawk (T-ATF-170) is a  owned by the United States Navy that was in service from 1980 to 2005 with the Military Sealift Command before being placed in reserve during 2005.

Mohawk was laid down on 23 March 1979 by the Marinette Marine Corporation at Marinette, Wisconsin. Launched on 5 April 1980, and delivered to the U.S. Navy on 16 October 1980, Mohawk was assigned to the Military Sealift Command (MSC), and placed in non-commissioned service as USNS Mohawk (T-ATF-170) in 1980.

Mohawk is equipped with a  capacity crane and a bollard pull of at least . That allowed for the bolting down of a wide variety of portable equipment. There are two GPH fire pumps supplying three fire monitors with up to 2,200 US gallons of foam per minute (0.14 m3/s). A deep module can be embarked to support naval salvage teams.

Mohawk was taken out of service on 16 August 2005 and placed in reserve in the Inactive Reserve Fleet at Philadelphia, Pennsylvania.

References

External links 

 NavSource.org: USNS Mohawk

 

Tugs of the United States Navy
Cold War auxiliary ships of the United States
Ships built by Marinette Marine
1980 ships